The 1961 Appalachian State Mountaineers football team was an American football team that represented Appalachian State Teachers College (now known as Appalachian State University) as a member of the Carolinas Conference during the 1961 NAIA football season. In their second year under head coach Jim Duncan, the Mountaineers compiled an overall record of 7–3, with a mark of 5–1 in conference play, and finished second in the NSC.

Schedule

References

Appalachian State
Appalachian State Mountaineers football seasons
Appalachian State Mountaineers football